HMS Spartan was an  cruiser of the Royal Navy constructed in 1891. The ships had quick firing guns which were effective as a broadside, but less so when attempting to fire fore or aft.

In late 1899 she had a refit, and when completed in early February 1900 she was placed in the A division of the Devonport Fleet reserve. 
From 1907 she was placed on harbour duty. In 1921 she became part of the Royal Navy torpedo school at Devonport, HMS Defiance, which was based in floating obsolete ships, and named for the first ship which had housed the school. Spartan became Defiance II in August 1921.  She was sold for scrapping on 26 June 1931.

Notes

References

navalhistory ship specifications

 

Apollo-class cruisers
Ships built by Armstrong Whitworth
Ships built on the River Tyne
1891 ships